Manuel Abreu Faguaga (born March 8, 1977) is a retired Uruguayan footballer.

References

External links
 Profile at BDFA 

1977 births
Living people
Uruguayan people of Portuguese descent
Uruguayan footballers
Uruguayan expatriate footballers
Uruguay under-20 international footballers
Defensor Sporting players
Racing Club de Montevideo players
Unión San Felipe footballers
Deportes Temuco footballers
Cobresal footballers
Coquimbo Unido footballers
C.D. Luis Ángel Firpo footballers
Tacuarembó F.C. players
Deportes Quindío footballers
Liverpool F.C. (Montevideo) players
Independiente Santa Fe footballers
Montevideo Wanderers F.C. players
Miramar Misiones players
Uruguayan Primera División players
Chilean Primera División players
Categoría Primera A players
Expatriate footballers in Chile
Expatriate footballers in Colombia
Expatriate footballers in El Salvador
Association football forwards